On 17 August 2022, the Abu Bakr al Sadiq Mosque in Kabul, Afghanistan was bombed. Many were reported killed in the explosion. Residents nearby also heard gunshots after the explosion occurred. No group claimed responsibility for the attack, although it was almost surely perpetrated by IS-KP, which has stepped up attacks targeting the Taliban and Afghan civilians since the former insurgents’ takeover of the country in August 2021, as U.S. and NATO troops were in the final stages of their withdrawal. The previous week, IS-KP claimed responsibility for killing a prominent Taliban cleric at his religious center in Kabul.

Victims
Kabul's Emergency Hospital received at least 27 victims of the explosion. 2 arrived deceased, while another died undergoing treatment. Among those killed was the mosque's imam Mawlawi Amir Muhammad Kabuli, a prominent Taliban cleric who also ran an Islamic school at the site of the explosion. It was later reported that 21 people were killed and 33 were wounded, though some witnesses at the scene put the death toll higher, with one witness claiming that "many other Taliban, as well children, were martyred” and that the total number of actual casualties was "more than 100 (killed and wounded)."

See also
 List of terrorist attacks in Kabul

References

2022 in Kabul
2022 murders in Afghanistan
2020s crimes in Kabul
August 2022 crimes in Asia
August 2022 events in Afghanistan
21st-century mass murder in Afghanistan
Explosions in 2022
Mass murder in 2022
Mass murder in Kabul
Terrorist incidents in Afghanistan in 2022